Aaadonta fuscozonata depressa is a subspecies of land snail, a terrestrial pulmonate gastropod mollusk in the family Endodontidae. It is endemic to Palau, where it was only known from the tropical moist lowland forests of Peleliu. It is threatened by destruction and modification of its habitat.

References

Endodontidae
Endemic fauna of Palau
Gastropods described in 1976